Sesbania herbacea (syn. Sesbania exaltata) is a species of flowering plant in the legume family known by the common names bigpod sesbania, Colorado River-hemp, and coffeeweed. It is native to the United States, particularly the southeastern states, where it grows in moist environments. It can be found elsewhere as an introduced species. It is a woody herb growing to 3 meters or more in height. The leaves are made up of many pairs of oblong leaflets. The inflorescence is a small raceme of pealike flowers with yellow or purple-spotted petals.

References

External links
Jepson Manual Treatment

FAO Ecocrops
Photo gallery

Faboideae